Vladislav Leonidovich Inozemtsev (born 10 October 1968, Gorky, Soviet Union) is a Russian academician who is the director of the Moscow-based Centre for Research on Post-Industrial Societies, a nonprofit think tank. He is a professor and the chair at the Department of World Economy, Faculty of Public Governance, Moscow State Lomonosov University.

Career
Since November 2012, Inozemtsev has been chairman of the High Council of the Civilian Force, a Russian "center-liberal", pro-European political party. He authored Mikhail Prokhorov's presidential program, when the candidate ran third to Putin in the March 2012 elections.

He has been published in Foreign Affairs with Alexander Lebedev and with Ivan Krastev and in Russia in Global Affairs with Ilya Ponomarev, with Vladimir Ryzhkov and with Yekaterina Kuznetsova. His articles have also been published in M.NEWS.

In spring 2018 he concluded that the new Cold War between Russia and the West was based on the complete absence of rationality within Russian foreign policy. He could not see where Putin was aiming, except to become a dictator in a land that doesn't even try to keep up appearances of being a democracy. Trying to re-erect the Soviet Union wouldn't seem promising.

In 2021, Inozemtsev concluded that Putin became even more anti-western. The reason for this were personal incompatibilities with his western counterparts; Putin was "neither politician nor a military person″ but a spy instead, believing not in institutions and hirarchies, but in loyalty, trust and networks: "Putin believed that the world is being reigned by people instead of institutions".

In spring 2022 Inozemtsev claimed that Putin fulfilled "immaculately the catalog of what matters to be called fascism" according to the following four pillars:
 Irredentism and militarization
 statization of the Russian economy (by bureaucratisation),
 restructuration of the administration towards an absolute hierarchical crackdown of power
 symbolism and propaganda in Russia.

Regarding the 2022 Russian invasion of Ukraine, Inozemtsev said that sanctions would not convince Russians to get rid of Putin, as most of them really believed that Ukraine was a part of their country. The West should aim to have Putin charged for war crimes with a prospect to the elites, to end sanctions as soon as Putin and his generals would be transferred to the International Court of Justice. Russia had become a classical dictatorship.

References

External links
 Personal site (archived April 20, 2015)

1968 births
20th-century Russian economists
21st-century Russian economists
Living people
Writers from Nizhny Novgorod
Moscow State University alumni
Academic staff of Moscow State University
Russian activists against the 2022 Russian invasion of Ukraine
Russian dissidents
Russian economists
Russian politicians